Pierre Dudan (1916–1984) was a Russian-born Swiss actor and singer. He was born in Moscow to a Russian mother and a Swiss father. He married four times.

Selected filmography
 Night Warning (1946)
 The Fugitive (1947)
 The Lyons in Paris (1955)
 If Paris Were Told to Us (1956)
 A Touch of the Sun (1956)
 Anyone Can Kill Me (1957)
 The Roots of Heaven (1958)
 Certains l'aiment froide (1960)
 Dans l'eau qui fait des bulles (1961)
 Sentimental Education (1962)
 Thank You, Natercia (1963)

References

Bibliography
 Goble, Alan. The Complete Index to Literary Sources in Film. Walter de Gruyter, 1999.

External links
 

1916 births
1984 deaths
Swiss male film actors
20th-century Swiss male singers
Soviet emigrants to Switzerland